Anton Byström (born August 4, 1992) is a Swedish professional ice hockey player. He played with Modo Hockey in the Elitserien during the 2010–11 Elitserien season.

References

External links

1992 births
Modo Hockey players
Living people
Swedish ice hockey forwards
People from Örnsköldsvik Municipality
Sportspeople from Västernorrland County